Bradić may refer to:

 Bradić, Serbia
 Bradić (surname)